Richard Rogers (born January 1, 1950) is a Professor of Psychology at the University of North Texas, and an author of books on Forensic psychology, including Clinical Assessment of Malingering and Deception and Conducting Insanity Evaluations.
He has received many national awards, including the 2004-2005 Toulouse Scholars Award, UNT's Eminent Faculty Award, and the Manfred S. Guttmacher Award from the American Psychiatric Association.

Footnotes

External links

Forensic psychologists
21st-century American psychologists
Living people
University of North Texas faculty
1950 births
20th-century American psychologists